In the course of the peopling of the World by Homo sapiens, East Asia was reached about 50,000 years ago (50 kya). The "recent African origin" lineage of 70 kya diverged into identifiable East Asian and West Eurasian lineages by about 50 kya. This early East Asian lineage diverged further during the Last Glacial Maximum, contributing outgoing from Mainland Southeast Asia significantly to the peopling of the Americas via Beringia about 25 kya. After the last ice age China became cut off from neighboring island groups. The modern Mongoloid phenotype is estimated to have developed fully about 35,000 years ago, somewhere in Central China. The previous Paleo-Mongoloid phenotypes of early East Asians became either replaced or prevailed among more geographically distant groups.

Genetic history

Overview
A review paper by Melinda A. Yang (in 2022) summarized and concluded that a distinctive "Basal-East Asian population" referred to as 'East- and Southeast Asian lineage' (ESEA); which is ancestral to modern East Asians, Southeast Asians, Polynesians, and Siberians, originated in Mainland Southeast Asia at ~50,000BC, and expanded through multiple migration waves southwards and northwards respectively. This ESEA lineage gave rise to various sublineages, and is also ancestral to the Hoabinhian hunter-gatherers of Southeast Asia and the ~40,000 year old Tianyuan lineage found in Northern China, but already differentiated and distinct from European-related and Australasian-related lineages, found in other regions of prehistoric Eurasia. The ESEA lineage trifurcated from an earlier "eastern non-African" (ENA) or "East-Eurasian" meta-population, which also contributed to the formation of Ancient Ancestral South Indians (AASI) as well as to Australasians.

Archaeogenetic studies
Wang et al. (2021) found that the ancestries of individuals in Guangxi from between 9,000–6,000 BP can be modeled as mixtures of Upper Paleolithic source populations from both Guangxi and Fujian. During the early and late Neolithic, migration from the Fujian region significantly influenced the genetic profile of the Guangxi region but did not completely replace the earlier resident hunter-gatherer ancestry that was local to Guangxi. The main archaic individuals that were analyzed include the following.

Archaic individuals from 12,000–10,000 BP
Longlin (10,686–10,439 cal BP; Laomocao Cave , Longlin Autonomous County, Guangxi, China) is an Upper Paleolithic individual that was found to carry deep diverging East Asian ancestry. Even though the Longlin remains were found to have some physical features resembling those of archaic humans, genetic analysis revealed that Longlin carried similar levels of archaic human ancestry as in Neolithic and present-day East Asians. Longlin appears to be closely related to the Maludong or Red Deer Cave people. Genetic analysis also indicated that Longlin is more closely related to Ikawazu (ca. 2,700 BP; Ikawazu Shell Midden site (伊川津貝塚), Atsumi Peninsula, southern Aichi Prefecture, central Honshu, Japan), a Jomon individual, than to basal Asian lineages such as Hoabinhian. Longlin, Ikawazu, and coastal Neolithic East Asians from Shandong and Fujian likely all diverged from each other at around the same time.
Qihe-3 (11,747–11,356 cal BP; Qihe Cave , Zhangping, Fujian) is an Upper Paleolithic individual from the mountainous interior of Fujian, located about 100 km north of present-day Zhangzhou city. Qihe-2, a more recent specimen from a different layer of the same site dating to 8,428-8,359 cal BP, was also sequenced and found to be closely related to Iron Age Taiwanese and present-day Austronesians. Qihe-3 can be modeled as a mixture of ancestry found in coastal Neolithic East Asians (e.g., Boshan in Neolithic Shandong and Liangdao in Neolithic Fujian), as well as another deeply diverging East Asian lineage. A later specimen, Liangdao-2 (~7,600 BP; Liangdao, Fujian), was found to have mostly Qihe-3-related ancestry (82%–90%), as well as a smaller percentage of northern East Asian ancestry (10%–18%) that can be associated with Neolithic Shandong and other northern East Asian sites. As a result, there is more genetic continuity from the early to late Neolithic in Fujian than there is in Guangxi.
Archaic individuals from 9,000–6,000 BP
Dushan (8,974–8,593 cal BP; Linfeng Town , Tiandong County, Guangxi) is a male individual that can be modeled as a mixture of Longlin-related ancestry (17%) and Fujian-related ancestry (Qihe, 83%).
Baojianshan (8,335–6,400 cal BP; Baojianshan Cave site (Baojianshan Cave A), Longzhou County, Chongzuo City, Guangxi) can be modeled as a mixture of 72.3% Dushan-related ancestry and 27.7% Hoabinhian-related ancestry.

Huang et al. (2022) associate Dushan and Baojianshan-related ancestry with the first Neolithic farmers in Mainland Southeast Asia (MSEA), i.e. late Neolithic Austroasiatic-speaking farmers who expanded from southern China into MSEA. Among present-day populations, they found that:

Khmuic (Austroasiatic) speakers in Mainland Southeast Asia, such as the Mal (Htin) and Mlabri, mostly carry first MSEA farmer-related ancestry (69.2–75.2%).
West Hmongic speakers (Longlin Miao, Xilin Miao, and Hmong) have slightly more first MSEA farmer-related ancestry (32.3–35.0%) than Neolithic Fujian-related ancestry (23.7–26.0%).
Hlai, Maonan, and Guangxi Zhuang were found to have more more Neolithic Fujian-related ancestry (40.7–53.9%, with Hlai carrying the most at 46.1–53.9%) than first MSEA farmer-related ancestry (24.9–33.1%).
Similar to Kra-Dai-speaking populations, Southern Han Chinese in Fujian and Guangdong carry more late Neolithic Fujian-related ancestry (35.0–40.3%) than first MSEA farmer-related ancestry (21.8–23.6%).

Guangxi region individuals from 1,500–500 BP show genetic profiles that can be identified with present-day Kra-Dai and Hmong-Mien-speaking populations of southern China. They can be modeled as a mixture of 58.2%–90.6% Dushan-related (or Qihe-3-related) ancestry and 9.4%–41.8% northern East Asian-related ancestry, with the later attributed to relatively recent historical migrations from the north.

Huang et al. (2022) also detected gene flow from southern China to the Yellow River basin during the Neolithic; even today, present-day Northern Han Chinese carry some Southern East Asian farmer-related ancestry. For instance, individuals from early Neolithic Shandong in the lower Yellow river basin derive 32.0% of their ancestry from Neolithic Fujian-related ancestry, whereas further inland, individuals from the Yangshao culture in the middle Yellow River basin derive 32.2% of their ancestry from first MSEA farmer-related ancestry. There was also no significant gene flow between Neolithic Shandong-related and Yangshao-related populations, as post-Yangshao individuals do not show much Neolithic Shandong-related ancestry.

Paternal lineages

Looking at Y-DNA studies, it would seem that East Asian paternal lineages expanded in Asia approximately 50,000 years ago. People bearing genetic markers ancestral such as C, D, N, and O, as well as P (specifically Q), came through the Himalayan mountain range and proceeded to Southeast Asia. Haplogroup C moved to East Asia and Australia, with at least two subclades of the major East Asian branch migrating into the Americas, and with members of Haplogroup C-M38 spreading throughout Wallacea, New Guinea, Melanesia, and Polynesia. Another group of peoples, bearing the Y-DNA Haplogroup D, has left descendants mostly in the Andaman Islands, Tibet, and Japan. Haplogroup Q, believed to have arisen in Central Asia or Southern Siberia approximately 17,000 to 22,000 years ago, went north to populate Northern Siberia and the Americas. Some northern Chinese have this genetic marker. Haplogroups N and O, originated in Southern China and by 35,000 years ago went on to populate first Southeast Asia and then from Southeast Asia, left for East Asia. About 12,000 years ago, the ancestors of the Han Chinese, along with other O3‐M122 lineages, reached the upper and middle Yellow River basin. About 7000 years ago, they and the ancestors of the Tibetans split off from that parent group. About 5,000 years ago, the Han Chinese experienced rapid expansion, with notable gene flow into surrounding populations.

Thus before the Xia dynasty (est. 2000-1500 BC), for which there are no written records or direct archeological evidence, the Han Chinese were in rapid expansion.

This corresponds to the late period (2600-2000 BC) of the Longshan culture in the middle Yellow River area. As the Neolithic population in China reached its peak, the number of settlements increased. In some locations, such as the basin of the Fen River in southern Shanxi, the Yellow River in western Henan (confined by the Zhongtiao Mountains and Xiao Mountains), and the coastal Rizhao plain of southeast Shandong, a few very large (over 200 ha) centers developed. In more open areas, such as the rest of Shandong, the Central Plain (in Henan) and the Wei River basin in Shaanxi, local centers were more numerous, smaller (generally 20 to 60 ha) and fairly evenly spaced. Walls of rammed earth have been found in 20 towns in Shandong, nine in the Central Plain, and one (Taosi) in southern Shanxi, suggesting conflict between polities in these areas.

The expansion and rise of these various settlements could be due to the impetus of the collective benefit of the construction of irrigation works in the late Neolithic:

"Most of the labor to dike and drain an area is associated with digging a ditch and sidecasting the soil to make an earthen dike. To make the culvert and tide gate you can use an old worn-out canoe for the pipe .... and use just about any good-sized flat stones you can get your hands on. If you have twice as many people making your dike, you can make twice as many linear feet of dike. Doubling the perimeter of a square dike results in quadrupling the area within the dike."

The agricultural surplus would have allowed for a rapidly expanding population, which would provide more labor for irrigation. By the time of the establishment of the Xia and Shang dynasties, population estimates were at approximately 13 million people.

Studies of DNA remnants from the Central Plains area of China 3000 years ago show close affinity between that population and those of Northern Han today in both the Y-DNA and mtDNA. Both northern and southern Han show similar Y-DNA genetic structure.

Han Chinese are genetically distinguishable from Yamato Japanese and Koreans, and internally the different Han Chinese subgroups are genetically closer to each other than any of them are to Koreans and Japanese. But meanwhile when compared to Europeans genetics, the Han Chinese, Japanese and Koreans are closer to each other than Europeans. Genealogical research has indicated extremely similar genetic profiles of a less than 1% total variation in spectrum between these three groups. Southern Han Chinese and Northern Han Chinese are closest to each other and show the smallest differences when they are compared to other Asians. Vietnamese Ho Chi Minh City Kinh are close to Xishuangbanna's Dai ethnic minority. Koreans are also relatively close to northern Han Chinese. Japanese are more genetically distant from Koreans than Koreans are from northern Han Chinese. However Buryat Mongols and Qinghai Mongols are further from each other than Japanese and Korean despite both being Mongols. Comparisons between the Y chromosome SNP and MtDNA of modern Northern Han Chinese and 3,000 year old Hengbei ancient samples from China's Central Plains show they are extremely similar to each other and show continuity between ancient Chinese of Hengbei and current Northern Han Chinese while Southern Han Chinese were different from the people of Hengbei. This showed that already 3,000 years ago the current northern Han Chinese genetic structure was already formed.

Maternal lineages
Mitochondrial DNA studies likewise support the hypothesis that the ancestors of the Chinese came to Asia from Africa. The M Haplogroup, a descendant of the African L3 Haplogroup, originated somewhere between Africa, India and Central Asia. This marker alone is carried by all populations in South Asia, Southeast Asia, East Asia, Oceania, and most of the Amerindian populations.

Study of DNA remains from 3000 years ago show increasing diversity in mtDNA as the distance south and southwestward increase from the Central Plains area, indicating a male bias in the demic diffusion.

Climate history
During the Last Glacial Maximum, 29,000 to 18,000 years ago, northern China was a treeless steppe with areas of permafrost and southern China lost much of its forest cover. The sea level was much lower. Borneo, Indonesia, the Philippines, and the Japanese archipelago may have been accessible by land. With the end of the last ice age, a period of warming occurred lasting from 18,000 to 10,000 years ago. The oceans rose and inundated vast regions leaving little trace of coastal settlements used by these people. We know little about their languages. Their cultures are likely to have been diverse. There are many limestone cave sites in southern China which show human settlements. There is evidence of pottery making. The inhabitants had bone tools, fished, and hunted pigs and deer.

It is believed that the climate in southern China was warmer and wetter south of the Qing Ling mountains; elephants are known to have inhabited the Yangtze river region. The climate in Northeast China north of present-day Beijing was characterized as a cold steppe environment during this period. The presence of woolly mammoth is well documented.

The climate was also much warmer between 8,000 and 3,500 years ago. In the Shandong region, excavations have found the bones of alligators and elephants.

The development of agriculture about 10,000 years ago, with the domestication of millet in the Yellow River valley region and rice in the Yangtze River valley, may have been associated with accelerated growth in the number and size of settlements and the intensified development of local cultures and languages.

Settlement patterns
Early settlements in the Chinese Upper Paleolithic were either hunter-gatherer societies, or marine environment based societies characterized by shell middens. Relatively speaking the land was sparsely populated, as the peoples followed the coastal regions and the river valleys.

Neolithic settlements have been found from Liaoning province in the northeast to the Chengdu region in the southwest; from Gansu province in the northwest to sites in Fujian in the southeast. The settlement pattern in the Tibetan region is still unclear as there is debate as to whether there was a pre-Neolithic population movement into the region.

Holocene China

The origin of Sino-Tibetan is uncertain. It dates to the Neolithic, or just before the Neolithic. There are various proposals.  Van Driem (2005) proposes that Sino-Tibetan originated in the Sichuan Basin before 7000 BC, with an early migration into northeast India, and a later migration north of the predecessors of Chinese and Tibetic.  Matisoff (1991) places its origins in the eastern part of the Tibetan plateau around 4000 BC, with the various groups migrating out along the Yellow, Yangtze, Mekong, Salween and Brahmaputra rivers.  Blench and Post (2014) have proposed that the Sino-Tibetan homeland was in northeast India, the area of greatest diversity, around 7000 BC. Blench (2009) proposes that the earliest speakers of Sino-Tibetan were not farmers, since agriculture cannot be reconstructed for Proto-Sino-Tibetan. Rather, early Sino-Tibetan speakers were highly diverse hunter-gatherers and foragers.  More recent study published in the Proceedings of the National Academy of Sciences of the United States of America point to the origin of the Sino-Tibetan in northern China in the Neolithic Cishan culture and Yangshao culture.

The Austroasiatic languages (including Vietnamese, Khmer, etc.) likely originated from Southern China and would have entered Southeast Asia via Yunnan and the Mekong. Likewise, the Miao, Thai, Burmese, and Tibetan languages evolved in China. It is even accepted that proto-Austronesian speakers originated from China, migrated to Taiwan (Formosa), and then to the islands of the Pacific, especially since Taiwan is the place exhibiting the most diversity in Austronesian languages (see Formosan languages). By 3,000 years ago, the sophistication of some of the cultures neighboring that of the Han Chinese can be seen in the bronze artifacts of the Sanxingdui (Sichuan), Ban Chiang (Thailand) and Dong Son (Vietnam). The domestication of the horse 6,000 years ago in the Eurasian steppes led to cultures that mixed animal husbandry and agriculture. Indo-European speakers are known to have reached the Xinjiang region 4,000 years ago (see Tocharians).

Because the East Asian landmass was initially populated from the south, and the historical record shows the Han Chinese migrating to the south and southwest, the genetic relationship among all the peoples of China remains a challenging study.

See also
Peopling of Southeast Asia
List of Paleolithic sites in China
List of Neolithic sites in China
List of Bronze Age sites in China
List of first human settlements
Han Chinese#Genetics

References

History of ancient China
China